Blaine is an unincorporated community in Vernon County, in the U.S. state of Missouri.

History
Blaine was platted in 1884, and named after James G. Blaine, an American statesman and Republican politician. A post office called Blaine was established in 1884, and remained in operation until 1888.

References

Unincorporated communities in Vernon County, Missouri
Unincorporated communities in Missouri